Manhalli,   Manalli, is a small town in Bidar taluka of Bidar district in the Indian state of Karnataka.It is 20km from Bidar.

Demographics 
 India census, Manhalli had a population of 19124 with 10089 males and 9035 females.the education literacy is 54% .Manhalli main road is state highway No. 122 it goes to Bangalore and connect to the NH-65 also.
 Manhalli Is Hoblli. And Manhalli ZP Constancey Grampanchayath Manhalli

Lake 
Manhalli famous pound area around 3 square kilometer. It is located on Bidar road manhalli also state highway no -258
near opposite of Darwesh colony manhalli.

Masjeed and Temples 
 Shree Basaveshwar Temple
 Shree Bakkaprabhu Temple
 Shree Veerabhadreshwar Temple
 Shree Bhavani Mata Temple
 Shree Siddeshwar Temple
 Shree Hanuman Temple
 shree Panduranga Temple
 Shree Lingshwar temple
 Shree Bheerewhwar templ
 Jamia Masjid 
 Khadeem Masjid
 masjid e ammar
 Tahera masjid

Education 
 Running summer camp & Navodaya/Sainik/Rastriya military training for Kannada and English medium students from 5th standard to any degree  
 A.P.J abdul kalam Navodaya Training centre, Manhalli 
 Samskruti Computer Institute working with APJ Abdul kalam Computer Sakcharat Mission New Delhi and also working on PMGDISHA 
  http://kalamcomputers.co.in/
 Sirajul Uloom Arabic School
 Sirajul Uloom  Urdu High School
 Syed Jamaaluddin Primary School
 Syed Jamaaluddin PUC Collage  
 Basva School Manhalli
 Government Primary and High school Manhalli.
 Government DED college manhalli
 BBA college manhalli
 Government BA college manhalli
 Government PUC college of science and arts
 Government first grade college manahlli

Economics 
 Manhalli - 1 CSC center for all digital services & literacy program [PMGDISHA]
 SBI Costumer service Point Lingeshwar Complex Manhalli -Link Branch Manhalli(05978)Mobile no 9900759715
 CSC Lingeshwar Complex Shop No 02 
 Sugar cane
 Rice
 Vegetable
 grain nuts
csc Nagabhushan poona photo studio manhalli 
 CSC (Parshuram) Ravi Oprator

Hospitals 
 Government Hospital
 Govt Veterinary Hospital

Hotel 
 Hotel Naseeb
 Hotel Kairaat 
 Sidique Hotel
 Prabhu Hotel
 Rabbani Hotel
 shiva Hotel
 Belkeri Hotel
 hotel ashoka

See also 
 Bidar
 Districts of Karnataka

References

External links 
 http://bidar.nic.in/

Villages in Bidar district